The 1962 Tennessee gubernatorial election was held on November 6, 1962. Democratic nominee Frank G. Clement defeated Independent candidate William Anderson with 50.85% of the vote.

Primary elections
Primary elections were held on August 2, 1962.

Democratic primary

Candidates
Frank G. Clement, former Governor
P.R. Olgiati, Mayor of Chattanooga
William W. Farris
Lillard Anthony Watts
Ronald Little

Results

General election

Candidates
Major party candidates
Frank G. Clement, Democratic
Hubert David Patty, Republican 

Other candidates
William Anderson, Independent
E.B. Bowles, Independent

Results

References

1962
Tennessee
Gubernatorial
November 1962 events in the United States